The .475 No 2 Nitro Express is a British rifle cartridge developed by Eley Brothers in the early 20th century.

Design
The .475 No 2 Nitro Express is a rimmed bottle necked cartridge designed for use in single-shot and double rifles.

.475 No 2 Jeffery
Jefferys built a very fine handling double rifle for this round with a  barrel that weighed only  but retaining moderate recoil.

History
The .475 No 2 Nitro Express is one of several rounds developed in response to the British Army 1907 ban of .450 caliber ammunition into India and the Sudan which saw the development of the ballistically very similar .500/465 Nitro Express, .470 Nitro Express, .475 Nitro Express, and .476 Nitro Express.

Eley created the .475 No 2 Nitro Express by necking up their earlier .450 No 2 Nitro Express.

WWI service
In 1914 and early 1915, German snipers were engaging British Army positions with impunity from behind steel plates that were impervious to .303 British ball ammunition. In an attempt to counter this threat, the British War Office purchased sixty-two large bore sporting rifles from British rifle makers which were issued to Regiments, including a single .475 No 2 Nitro Express rifle. These large bore rifles proved very effective against the steel plates used by the Germans, in his book Sniping in France 1914-18, MAJ H. Hesketh-Prichard, DSO, MC stated they "pierced them like butter."

Use
The .475 No 2 Nitro Express is considered good general purpose round, suitable for all big game in Africa and India, its power is very similar to the .450 Nitro Express, with a larger diameter bullet; whether this is an advantage remains in dispute.

In his African Rifles and Cartridges, John "Pondoro" Taylor stated the .475 No 2 Nitro Express is "an eminently satisfactory shell and a certain killer - but don't let yourself be hypnotised by that great fat gleaming shell into the belief that you have something comparable with the atomic bomb to play with!"

Because of the larger diameter bullet, .475 No 2 Jeffery rounds cannot be fired through .475 No.2 Nitro Express rifles.

See also
Nitro Express
List of rifle cartridges
12 mm caliber

References

External links
 Cartridgecollector, .475 No. 2 Nitro Express ("), cartridgecollector.net, retrieved 16 December 2016.
 Cartridgecollector, .475 No. 2 Jeffery Nitro Express ("), cartridgecollector.net, retrieved 16 December 2016.

Pistol and rifle cartridges
British firearm cartridges
Military cartridges
Eley Brothers cartridges
W.J. Jeffery & Co cartridges